Mirco Mezzanotte (born 11 February 1974) is an Italian ski mountaineer.

Selected results 
 2000:
 7th ("seniors I" class ranking), Patrouille des Glaciers (together with Oswald Santin and Manfred Dorfmann)
 2001:
 3rd, Sellaronda Skimarathon (together with Franco Nicolini)<ref name="sellaronda">[http://www.newspower.it/comunicati/sellaronda/AlbodoroSellaronda.rtf Sellaronda Skimarathon - roll of honor"]</ref>
 2002:
 1st, Mountain Attack
 1st, Dolomiti Cup team (together with Franco Nicolini)
 9th, World Championship team race (together with Franco Nicolini)
 2003:
 3rd, European Championship team race (together with Camillo Vescovo)
 8th, European Championship combination ranking
 2004:
 8th, World Championship team race (together with Guido Giacomelli)
 2005:
 1st, Dolomiti Cup team (together with Carlo Battel)
 1st, Tour du Rutor (together with Guido Giacomelli)
 2nd, World Cup team (together with Guido Giacomelli)
 3rd, European Championship vertical race
 2006:
 1st, Adamello Ski Raid (together with Hansjörg Lunger and Guido Giacomelli)
 10th, World Championship vertical race
 2007:
 1st, Dolomiti Cup team (together with Olivier Nägele)
 2nd, Sellaronda Skimarathon (together with Daniele Pedrini)
 2nd, Scialpinistica del Monte Canin (together with Martin Riz)
 2008: 
 1st, Hochgrat-Skirallye
 2nd, Ski Alp Val Rendena

 Trofeo Mezzalama 

 2003: 4th, together with Camillo Vescovo and Guido Giacomelli
 2007: 5th, together with Graziano Boscacci and Ivan Murada

 External links 
 Mirco Mezzanotte at skimountaineering.org''

References 

1974 births
Living people
Italian male ski mountaineers